Arrigoni is a surname. Notable people with the surname include:

Alessandro Arrigoni (1764-1819), Italian painter
Alessandro Arrigoni (bishop) (d. 1674), Italian Roman Catholic bishop
Andrea Arrigoni (born 1988), Italian footballer
Angelo Arrigoni (1923–2014), Italian rugby union and professional rugby league footballer
Carlo Arrigoni (1697–1744), Italian composer and musician
Daniele Arrigoni (born 1959), Italian football manager and former player
Enrico Arrigoni (1894–1986), Italian-born American individualist anarchist
Giacomo Arrigoni (1597-1675), Italian composer
Giacomo Balardi Arrigoni (d. 1435), Italian Roman Catholic bishop
Marco Arrigoni (born 1988), Italian footballer
Pompeio Arrigoni (1552–1616), Italian Roman Catholic cardinal
Simone Arrigoni (born 1973), Italian free-diver
Tommaso Arrigoni (born 1994), Italian footballer
Vittorio Arrigoni (1975-2011), Italian reporter and ISM activist